Dheerasameere Yamuna Theere is a 1977 Indian Malayalam-language film directed by Madhu and produced by M. Mani. The film stars Madhu, Kaviyoor Ponnamma, Thikkurissy Sukumaran Nair and Unnimary. The film has musical score by Shyam. It was the first film produced in Uma Studio founded by Madhu.

Cast
Madhu
Kaviyoor Ponnamma
Thikkurissy Sukumaran Nair
Unnimary
T. P. Madhavan
Vidhubala

Soundtrack
The music was composed by Shyam and the lyrics were written by O. N. V. Kurup.

References

External links
 

1977 films
1970s Malayalam-language films
Films shot in Thiruvananthapuram